Markus Husterer (born 16 June 1983 in Ingolstadt) is a retired German footballer.

References

External links
 

1983 births
Living people
German footballers
FC Bayern Munich II players
VfB Stuttgart players
Eintracht Frankfurt players
Eintracht Braunschweig players
FSV Frankfurt players
Kickers Offenbach players
Bundesliga players
2. Bundesliga players
3. Liga players
Association football defenders
Sportspeople from Ingolstadt
Footballers from Bavaria